Veronika Sharametsyeva (born 1 December 1982) is a road cyclist from Belarus. She represented her nation in the road race at the 2005 UCI Road World Championships but failed to finish.

References

External links
 profile at Procyclingstats.com

1982 births
Belarusian female cyclists
Living people
Place of birth missing (living people)